Yaropolk may refer to
Yaropolk I of Kiev (Yaropolk Svyatoslavich) (about 950–980)
Yaropolk Izyaslavich (about 1050–about 1100)
Yaropolk II of Kiev (Yaropolk Vladimirovich), (1082–1139)
Yaropolk, son of Vladimir of Novgorod